The Solent Devils 2 are an amateur ice hockey team based in Gosport, Hampshire. They currently play in the NIHL 2 South West Division. The Solent Devils 2 are a minor league affiliate of the Solent Devils of the NIHL 1 South Division.

Season-by-season record

Club roster 2020–21

2020/21 Outgoing

References 

Ice hockey teams in England
Gosport
Sports clubs in Hampshire